"Winter Melody" is a song by American singer and songwriter Donna Summer released as a single in early-1977 from her Four Seasons of Love album. It became a top 30 hit in the UK, where it peaked at #27.

By this time Summer was making her name as the queen of disco music, though this song is a soul ballad. The song represented the "winter" phase of the concept album, and speaks of a woman struggling to come to terms with the fact that her relationship has ended. As with much of Summer's material at that time (particularly with songs found on her concept albums), the song played for a considerable amount of time (over six minutes), however, the song was edited for its release as a single.

Record World said that "This is the ballad that should establish the songstress as more than just a disco personality."

Weekly charts

References

Donna Summer songs
1977 songs
Songs written by Pete Bellotte
Songs written by Giorgio Moroder
Songs written by Donna Summer
Casablanca Records singles
Song recordings produced by Pete Bellotte
Song recordings produced by Giorgio Moroder
GTO Records singles
1977 singles
Songs about heartache
Soul ballads